Arp 271 is a pair of similarly sized interacting spiral galaxies, NGC 5426 and NGC 5427, in the constellation of Virgo. It is not certain whether the galaxies are going to eventually collide or not. They will continue interacting for tens of millions of years, creating new stars as a result of the mutual gravitational attraction between the galaxies, a pull seen in the bridge of stars already connecting the two. Located about 130 million light-years away, the Arp 271 pair is about 130,000 light-years across. It was originally discovered in 1785 by William Herschel. It is speculated, that the Milky Way will undergo a similar collision in about five billion years with the neighbouring Andromeda Galaxy, which is currently located about 2.6 million light-years away.

One supernova, SN 2021pfs (Type Ia, mag. 14.0), was discovered in NGC 5427 in June 2021.

Gallery

References

External links

 Arp 271 — Galaxies Drawn Together, ESO picture of the week.

271
NGC objects
Virgo (constellation)
Discoveries by William Herschel
UGCA objects
Unbarred spiral galaxies